Inbetweener may refer to:

 "Inbetweener" (song), a song by Sleeper
 Inbetweener, an animator's assistant who performs the task of inbetweening
 In-Betweener, a fictional character in comic books published by Marvel Comics
 The Inbetweeners, a 2008–2010 British TV comedy series
 The Inbetweeners Movie, a 2011 British film based on the TV series
 The Inbetweeners 2, a 2014 British comedy film sequel to The Inbetweeners Movie
 The Inbetweeners (U.S. TV series), a 2012 U.S. remake of the British TV series

See also
 In Between (disambiguation)
 Between (disambiguation)